The Official Vinyl Albums Chart is a weekly record chart compiled by the Official Charts Company (OCC) on behalf of the music industry in the United Kingdom since April 2015. It lists the 40 most popular albums in the gramophone record (or "vinyl") format. This is a list of the albums which reached number one on the Official Vinyl Albums Chart in the 2010s.

Number ones

By record label
18 record labels have topped the chart for at least three weeks.

By artist
10 artists topped the chart for at least three weeks.

See also
 List of Official Vinyl Singles Chart number ones of the 2010s

Notes

References

External links
Official Vinyl Albums Chart Top 40 at the Official Charts Company

Vinyl